Rob Watson may refer to:

 Rob Watson (athlete) (born 1983), Canadian long-distance runner
 Rob Watson (musician), keyboard player, producer and composer
 Robert K. Watson (born 1961), American environmentalist

See also
 Robert Watson (disambiguation)